Rookie Fireman is a 1950 American drama film directed by Seymour Friedman and written by Jerry Sackheim. The film stars Bill Williams, Barton MacLane, Marjorie Reynolds, Gloria Henry, Richard Quine and John Ridgely. The film was released on September 8, 1950 by Columbia Pictures.

Plot

Cast          
Bill Williams as Joe Blake
Barton MacLane as Captain Jess Henshaw
Marjorie Reynolds as Margie Williams
Gloria Henry as Peggy Walters
Richard Quine as Johnny Truitt
John Ridgely as Harry Williams
Richard Benedict as Al Greco
Cliff Clark as Captain Mack Connors
Barry Brooks as Harris
George Eldredge as Floyd
Steve Pendleton as Potts 
Frank Sully as Charlie
Ted Jordan as Hanover

References

External links
 

1950 films
American drama films
1950 drama films
Columbia Pictures films
Films directed by Seymour Friedman
American black-and-white films
1950s English-language films
1950s American films